Karim Mouzaoui (born 20 November 1975) is a French former footballer of Algerian descent who played as a forward.

Mouzaoui began his professional career with Strasbourg, but only played two Ligue 1 matches for the club, and was loaned out to Laval where he played in 29 Ligue 2 matches. He moved to Greece and played for Apollon Kalamarias in the Greek Beta Ethniki, before moving to Greek Alpha Ethniki side Panionios. While at Panionios, Mouzaoui was suspended for four months after failing a doping test in January 2003.

Next, Mouzaoui spent two seasons with Cypriot side Apollon Limassol before returning to Greece where he would play for Apollon Kalamarias and Veria F.C. in the Greek Super League.

In 2008, he joined Makedonikos F.C. of the Greek Third Division.

References

External links
Profile at Racing Stub

1975 births
Living people
Association football forwards
French footballers
French sportspeople of Algerian descent
RC Strasbourg Alsace players
Stade Lavallois players
Apollon Pontou FC players
Panionios F.C. players
Pierikos F.C. players
Veria F.C. players
Apollon Limassol FC players
ASPV Strasbourg players
Kastoria F.C. players
Makedonikos F.C. players
Expatriate footballers in Cyprus
Expatriate footballers in Greece
Ligue 1 players
Ligue 2 players
Super League Greece players
Cypriot First Division players
Algerian expatriates in Cyprus
Algerian expatriates in Greece